Hamsterley may refer to:

 Hamsterley, Bishop Auckland, a village in County Durham, England
 Hamsterley, Consett, a village in County Durham, England
 Hamsterley Forest, near Bishop Auckland
 Hamsterley Hall, a country house near Consett
 Hamsterley Mill, a village near Consett
 Ralph Hamsterley (died 1518), Master of University College, Oxford

See also